Line 3 of the Harbin Metro is a rapid transit line in Harbin, running from  to .

History

Phase 1
It is 5.45 km long with 5 stations, all of which are underground.

Harbindajie station opened as an infill station on June 16, 2017. Harbindajie station renamed to  station on March 20, 2019.

Phase 2 (initial section)

Phase 2 (remaining section)
The section will open in 2023.

Opening timeline

Stations

Legend
 - Stations in operation
 - Under construction, opening in 2023

Notes

Rolling stock
Services on the line are provided by six-car Type B trains, which have a total capacity of 1440. These trains are the same as those which run on Line 1.

Future Development
The  second phase of the line, which extends it to the southeast and northwest, began construction in 2017. It consists of 30 stations, of which 19 are on the southeastern portion and the remaining 11 on the northwestern. The southeastern portion opened on November 26, 2021, while the northwestern would do so in 2023.

References

03
Railway lines opened in 2017
Railway loop lines